The 2021–22 season was the 77th season in the existence of K.A.S. Eupen and the club's sixth consecutive season in the top flight of Belgian football. In addition to the domestic league, Eupen participated in this season's edition of the Belgian Cup.

Players

First-team squad

Out on loan

Transfers

Pre-season and friendlies

Competitions

Overall record

First Division A

League table

Results summary

Results by round

Matches
The league fixtures were announced on 8 June 2021.

Belgian Cup

References

K.A.S. Eupen
Eupen